Roberto's spiny-rat (Proechimys roberti) or Para spiny rat, is a spiny rat species  found in Brazil.

Morphological, karyological, and mitochondrial DNA (cytochrome b) data indicate that Proechimys oris is likely a junior synonym of P. roberti.

Phylogeny
Morphological characters and mitochondrial cytochrome b DNA sequences showed that P. roberti belongs to the so-called guyannensis group of Proechimys species, and shares closer phylogenetic affinities with the other member of this clade: P. guyannensis.

References

Proechimys
Mammals described in 1901
Taxa named by Oldfield Thomas